Horace Mann Historic District is a national historic district located at Gary, Indiana, United States. The district encompasses 130 contributing buildings and 1 contributing site in an exclusively residential section of Gary. They were largely built between 1919 and 1961, and include examples of Colonial Revival, Tudor Revival, Renaissance Revival, Spanish Colonial Revival, and Bungalow / American Craftsman style architecture.

It was listed in the National Register of Historic Places in 2013.

References

Historic districts on the National Register of Historic Places in Indiana
Houses on the National Register of Historic Places in Indiana
Colonial Revival architecture in Indiana
Tudor Revival architecture in Indiana
Renaissance Revival architecture in Indiana
Mission Revival architecture in Indiana
Historic districts in Gary, Indiana
National Register of Historic Places in Gary, Indiana